is a Japanese actress from Osaka Prefecture. After winning the Amuse Ohimesama Audition, she was signed onto the Amuse, Inc. talent agency. She starred as the female lead in Kamen Rider W in 2009-2010.

Filmography

Television

Anime

Film

References

External links
 Personal blog

1991 births
Japanese film actresses
Japanese television actresses
Living people
People from Osaka Prefecture
21st-century Japanese women singers
21st-century Japanese singers